Plasmodium multivacuolaris is a parasite of the genus Plasmodium subgenus Novyella

Like all Plasmodium species P. multivacuolaris has both vertebrate and insect hosts. The vertebrate hosts for this parasite are birds.

Taxonomy
The parasite was first described by Valkiūnas et al. in 2008.

Distribution
This parasite is found in West Africa.

Vectors
Not known.

Hosts
P. multivacuolaris infects the yellow-whiskered greenbul (Andropadus latirostris).

References

multivacuolaris
Parasites of birds